Ab Pay-ye Arghuan (also Romanized as Āb Pāy-ye Arghūān; also known as Āb Pā-ye Arghūn, Apqūn, Arghūn, and Owpā-ye Arghūn) is a village in Poshtkuh Rural District, Bushkan District, Dashtestan County, Bushehr Province, Iran. At the 2006 census, its population was 124, in 27 families.

References 

Populated places in Dashtestan County